Ribeira Bote is a subdivision of the city of Mindelo in the island of São Vicente, Cape Verde. Its population was 3,956 at the 2010 census. It borders the city centre to the northwest and Fonte Cónego to the north. The Hospital Velho and the church Nossa Senhora Auxiliadora are located in Ribeira Bote.

References

Mindelo